Jamia Hamdard  is an institute of higher education deemed to be university located in New Delhi, India. It is a government-funded university. Established in 1989, it was formally inaugurated by the then Prime Minister of India Shri Rajiv Gandhi on August 1, 1989. In 2019, it was awarded the Institute of Eminence status by Ministry of Human Resource Development.

Campus

Library

The library system consists of a central library and six faculty libraries: the faculties of science, medicine, pharmacy, nursing, Islamic studies, and management studies and information technology. The central library is named ‘Hakim Mohammed Said Central Library’, after the younger brother of the founder.

Computer centre

The university has a computer centre which works as a lab for the Department of Computer Science, computing facilities, and system analysis units, as well as all necessary peripherals and requisite software. There are five laboratories in the computer centre, with facilities for their respective development fields.

Scholars' House

The Scholars' House is a guest house for scholars, university guests, outside examiners, members of the selection board, and residential conferences.

It has 12 double-bed rooms, 27 single-bed rooms, and 4 flats.

Convention Centre 
The university has a convention centre seating 200.

Jamia Hamdard is governed by its Bye Laws (Memorandum of Association) registered with the Registrar of Societies on 15th May, 2017 under the Societies Registration Act, 1860 (http://www.jamiahamdard.ac.in/University_Reports/JH_MOA.pdf). The Board of Management is the highest decision making authority and executive body of the Jamia Hamdard as per the Bye Laws.  These Bye-laws have been framed by the Jamia Hamdard management in conformity with the University Grants Commission Regulations called "UGC [INSTITUTIONS DEEMED TO BE UNIVERSITIES] REGULATIONS, 2016" as notified in the Gazette of India vide Notification F. No. 1-3/2016(CPPPI/DU) dated 11th July, 2016 . The authority bodies of the Jamia Hamdard under rule 2 of the rules framed under its Bye Laws are Chancellor, Board of Management, Academic Council, Finance Committee, Planning & Monitoring Board, School Board, Board of Studies (Departmental level). The sponsoring body of the Jamia Hamdard as per its constitution (Bye Laws) is "Hamdard National Foundation, a registered charitable 'not for profit' body having the Jamia Hamdard under its administrative, academic and financial control as the sponsoring body is vested with the powers to appoint the Chancellor and Pro-Chancellor.

Faculties
Schools of Studies:
Pharmacy: The School of Pharmaceutical Education and Research (erstwhile Faculty of Pharmacy) is one of the oldest pharmacy institutes in India. It was awarded the number one rank in India in the year 2017, 2019 and 2021 by the Ministry of Human Resource Development, Government of India via its National Institute Ranking Framework. The school offers diploma, undergraduate, graduate and Ph.D. programs in pharmacy and pharmaceutical sciences. The institute is research intensive and has numerous notable alumni in the pharmaceutical industry in both India and abroad. The School retained its top position amongst Indian Pharmacy Colleges for the year 2022 in NIRF rankings.
Hamdard Institute of Legal Studies and Research: which offers BA.LLB(5 years integrated course) for undergraduates.
Interdisciplinary Sciences and Technology: which offers the Food technology program for undergraduate and postgraduate students
Management Studies & Information Technology
Engineering Sciences and technology
Hamdard Institute of Medical Sciences and Research ( HIMSR ) & Associated Hakeem Abdul Hameed Centenary Hospital
School of Unani Medical Education and Research (Unani)
School of Nursing and Allied Health Sciences
Islamic Studies & Social Sciences
Science
 Biotechnology
 Biochemistry   
 Botany
 Toxicology
 Chemistry
 Clinical Research

Central Instrumentation Facility (CIF)

Central Instrumentation Facility was established in the Faculty of Pharmacy in July 1990 with the installation of L7 Backman Ultra-centrifuge, Sorval Rt-6000 low-speed centrifuge, DU-64 Backman UV-VIS Spectrometer, Perkin-Elmer 8700 Gas Chromatograph, Perkin-Elmer HPLC and Mettler electronic balance. In the year 1992, gamma-counter, beta-counter and DNA Electrophoresis systems were added to the CIF. Perkin-Elmer Lambda-20 Double-beam UV-VIS spectrophotometer, Perkin-Elmer LS-50 luminescence spectrometer, Bio-rad FT-IR spectrometers and mini-computer facility comprising eight computers, Internet and e-mail facilities are also available in CIF.

The objective of CIF is to provide an instrumentation facility to the researchers of Jamia Hamdard, in addition, to train the Ph.D. and M.Pharm/M.Sc.. students on various equipment. Jamia Hamdard research students operate instruments themselves for their experiments. Ph.D. students, use CIF during late hours and on weekends to complete their experiments. Several M.Pharm. and Ph.D. scholars have used the CIF for their research.

Hamdard Institute of Medical Sciences and Research (HIMSR) & Hakim Abdul Hameed Centenary Hospital
The founder of the university Janab Hakeem Abdul Hameed had conceived of starting a medical college in 1953 alongside the Unani system of medicine. HIMSR  is one of the top-ranked Private Medical College in North India. In July 2012 the Medical Council of India gave permission to Jamia Hamdard to start a medical college on its campus. Before that, the university renamed the erstwhile Majeedia Hospital to Hakeem Abdul Hameed Centenary Hospital (HAH Centenary Hospital) and to attach this to a newly established medical Institute - Hamdard Institute of Medical Sciences of Research (HIMSR). HAH Centenary Hospital has 650 teaching beds currently housing all broad clinical disciplines with blood bank and hospital laboratory services. HIMSR was the sixth medical college in National Capital Territory of Delhi, and the first model hospital in the public-private sector in the capital city of Delhi. The first batch of MBBS students was taken in August 2012.

The institute conducts research in cancer, diabetes and cardiovascular diseases. The Institute started a one-year postgraduate diploma in Preventive Cardiology in collaboration with All India Heart Foundation and the National Heart Institute, New Delhi. The Hamdard Imaging Centre has been established to provide medical imaging under one roof.  Free OPD facilities are provided to University students, teaching and non-teaching staff, their family members and very poor people.

HIMSR provides undergraduate, postgraduate and PhD courses in medical subjects.

Distance Education by Jamia Hamdard

The School of Open and Distance Learning (SODL) of Jamia Hamdard was established in 2004 to promote education through an open and distance learning system. Its flexible and innovative methods of education to ensure 'independent learning' to anyone, anytime and anywhere.

Jamia Hamdard has introduced three online degree courses for students all over India and World. The three online courses are:

 1 BBA (Bachelor of Business Administration) Eligibility: A Candidates Must have passed 10+2 examination from a recognized board/institute/ university. Duration: Six Semester Admission Fee: Rs. 14, 000.00 per Semester Examination Fee: Rs. 2000.00 per Semester Fee for Foreign Students: USD 600 Per Semester.
 2 BCA (Bachelor of Computer Application) Eligibility: A Candidates Must have passed 10+2 examination from a recognized board/institute/ university. Duration: Six Semester Admission Fee: Rs. 16,000.00 per Semester Examination Fee: Rs. 2000.00 per Semester Fee for Foreign Students: USD 600 Per Semester.
 3 B.Com. H.(Bachelor of Commerce- (Honors) Eligibility: A Candidates seeking admission to B.Com(H.) The program must have passed the 10+2 examination from a recognized board/institute/university Admission Fee: Rs. 14,000.00 per Semester Examination Fee: Rs. 2000.00 per Semester Fee for Foreign Students: USD 600 Per Semester.

Academics

Academic programmes
The university offers graduate and post-graduate programs in Modern Medicine, Unani Medicine, Nursing, Pharmacy, Law, Information Technology, Computer Applications, Business Management, Islamic Studies, Human Rights, federal studies, Paramedical Sciences, Physiotherapy, Occupational Therapy,Journalism and Media.

It recently launched a new course in Medical Virology to cater to demands for trained virologists in India in Covid Times.

Rankings

Internationally, Jamia Hamdard was ranked 1201–1400 in the QS World University Rankings of 2023 and 451–500 in Asia. It was ranked 601–800 in the world by the Times Higher Education World University Rankings of 2023, 301–350 in Asia in 2022 and 351–400 among emerging economies.

In India, it was ranked 37th overall by the National Institutional Ranking Framework (NIRF) in 2020, 21st among universities, 22nd in the medical ranking and first in the pharmacy ranking.

Student life

Facilities
Jamia Hamdard provides residential facilities for its staff and students, both in and outside the campus. There are nine residential blocks in the campus which are meant for the residence of all categories of the teaching and non-teaching employees.

Jamia Hamdard has separate girls' and boys' hostels. Every hostel has a common room, reading room, dining hall, and visitors’ room. Number of hostels are as follows:

 2 UG girls hostels
 1 PG girls hostel.
 1 UG boys hostel. 
 1 Ibn-e-Batuta P.G. Boys hostel. (For MBBS Students and Ph.D. Students).
 1 International boys hostel. (Jawahar Lal Nehru Hostel)
 1 P.G. Boys hostel for all stream students

A gymnasium, basketball ground. Playgrounds for cricket and football(5-A side) are also available.

The university has three canteens which are partially subsidized and are run by contractors.

See also
 Distance Education Council
 Education in India
 Education in Delhi
 Hamdard University Bangladesh
 Hamdard University Pakistan
 List of universities in India
 Universities and colleges in India
 University Grants Commission (India)

References

External links

 Virtual tour of Jamia Hamdard Campus (YouTube)
 Jamia Hamdard Online Degree Website

Universities and colleges in Delhi
Deemed universities in India
Unani medicine organisations
1989 establishments in Delhi
Educational institutions established in 1989